883 (pronounced otto otto tre) was an Italian pop group active from 1989 to 2003.

History
883 were formed by singers Max Pezzali and Mauro Repetto after their roles on the 1989 television series 1,2,3, Jovanotti (at that time, the name of the band was 'I Pop'). Being big fans of motorbikes, especially Harley-Davidsons, they decided to name the group 883 after the 883cc Harley-Davidson Sportster. They recorded some demos and forwarded them to Claudio Cecchetto, a DJ and producer who had worked on 1,2,3, Jovanotti. The group released their debut single "Non me la Menare" which became a smash hit in Italy. Their first album, "Hanno ucciso l'Uomo Ragno" ("They killed Spider-Man"), hit number 1 on the Italian charts. Their second album, Nord Sud Ovest Est, produced the number 1 singles "Sei un Mito" and "Come Mai". Upon the release of their third album, Repetto left the group. Pezzali recruited new members and continued the band name. "Un Giorno Così", from the 1997 album La Dura Legge del Gol!, also went to number 1 in Italy. In 1998, the group released a film about themselves, entitled Jolly Blu. A greatest hits collection was issued in 1998 as Gli Anni. After Grazie Mille (1999) and Uno in + (2001), Pezzali himself went solo in 2003.

Under the brand '883/Max Pezzali', 11 albums (out of 15) reached the first position of the Italian charts: Hanno Ucciso L'Uomo Ragno, Nord Sud Ovest Est, La Donna, Il Sogno E Il Grande Incubo, La Dura Legge Del Gol!, Gli Anni, Uno in +, Il Mondo Insieme a Te, TuttoMax, Time Out, Hanno Ucciso L'Uomo Ragno 2012 and Max 20. They also sold over 10 million albums and won Festivalbar (one of the most important musical competition in the country) a total of three times: in 1993 (best album), in 1995 (best song) and finally in 2005 (best album).

Members
Founders
 Max Pezzali - vocals (1991–2003)
 Mauro Repetto - vocals (1991–1994)

Additional musicians
 Roberto Drovandi - bass (1995–1996)
 Leandro Misuriello - bass (1995–1996)
 Roberto Melone - bass (1997–1999)
 Matteo Bassi - bass (1999–2002)
 Ivan Ciccarelli - drums (1995–1998)
 Eugenio Mori drums (1998–2000)
 Emiliano Bassi - drums (2001–2002)
 Jacopo Corso - guitar (1995–1996)
 Piero Cazzago - guitar (1997–1998)
 Fabrizio Frigeni - guitar (1999–2000)
 Daniele Gregolin - guitar (2001–2002)
 Roberto Priori - guitar (1995–1999)
 Matteo Salvadori - guitar (1998–2002)
 Massimiliano Pelan - guitar (2002–2003)
 Sandro Verde - keyboards (1995–1996)
 Alberto Tafuri - keyboards (1997–2002)
 Stefano Cecere - keyboards, programming (1997–1998)
 Daniele Moretto - keyboards, backing vocals (1995–2000)
 Michele Monestiroli - saxophone, guitar, backing vocals (1995–2000)
 Gabriel Nuzzoli - percussion (1997–1999)
 Claudio Borrelli - percussion (1999–2000)
 Chiara Iezzi - guitar, backing vocals (1995)
 Paola Iezzi - guitar, backing vocals (1995)

Discography

Studio albums

Compilation albums

Singles

References

Musical groups established in 1991
Musical groups disestablished in 2003
Italian pop music groups